The 1965 Official Guide New York World's Fair is an event guide published and edited by Time–Life Books. It is a 280-page, soft-cover, highly, sometimes colorfully, illustrated book.  It is divided into multiple sections, such as maps, industrial, international, federal and state, transportation and index. Exhibits or pavilions are listed and described often with sketch-like illustrations and photographs. Many colorful advertisements also make up a part of the Guide. It was widely sold as guide to the 1964/1965 World's Fair, held at Flushing Meadows–Corona Park in New York City, US.  It is considered an important historic artifact by students and teachers of history, who use the guide to further their understanding of the World's Fair, its exhibits and contemporary culture.

Description of exhibits

Description of international exhibits
The description of the international exhibits spans 51 pages of the guide and is the second longest section after the description of Industrial Exhibits.  It lists some 45 pavilions.  Not all of the international pavilions listed are hosted by nations.  Thus there is a description for a Pavilion hosted by Berlin, which offers: "Film and color transparencies depict day-to-day life in this outpost of freedom," but none of Germany, Belgium or France.  England appears to be represented only by the "British Lion Pub".  Perhaps most surprisingly, the guide lists Billy Graham's pavilion as being in the International section.

Description of corporate exhibits
The description of corporate exhibits, which in this guide are referred to as Industrial, spans 56 pages of the guide.  Major exhibits in this section appear to have been General Motors' Futurama, General Electric's Progressland, IBM's dome and the Eastman Kodak Pavilion.  The Industrial section, in particular, has many advertisements, often for products produced by the companies which host the described pavilions.  The exhibits are listed alphabetically and described in a paragraph or two.   Admission, usually free, is also listed under each exhibit.  Because the Industrial section covers all exhibits not contained in the International and Federal and State sections, a wide array of both commercial and non-commercial exhibitors are listed together.  For example, the exhibit for the Boy Scouts of America is listed after Bell System. The former billed as "Scouts from around the U.S. display such skills as knot-typing, fire-making and lifesaving," while the latter is offers "The history of communications, from smoke signals to satellites, ... in a fifteen minute ride."

Advertisements
Many sophisticated advertisements are printed in the guide.  Most are directed at the Fair going public. In fact, the blending of content and advertisement is so sophisticated that it is, in places, nearly impossible to distinguish between the two. A two-page color advertisement for the Eastman Kodak Pavilion (billed as the "Focal Point of the Fair"), advertises not Kodak product, but the Pavilion itself.  Other exhibitors ran advertisement for their products alongside advertisement for their pavilion.  American Express, for example, ran an illustration of "The $1 Million Money Tree", exhibited at their pavilion, over a partial list of their products.

Value
The Guide the New York World's Fair is considered an important tool for teaching history, especially social history.  The guide gives insight into the cultural and social mores and practices of the mid-century United States. The description of the General Cigar Hall of Magic, for example, which speaks of giant smoke rings and magic shows acts as a reminder of the common place of smoking in North American society. A Chrysler advertisement that assures that “Mom will be thrilled by the landscaped islands and by the beauty of cars that seem to float on the water” speaks to gender roles in the mid-1960s in America.  Leaving aside specific examples, the optimistic tone of the guide may give some insight into the perception of the nation’s progress at the time.  A seemingly boundless trust in Industry and its products is evidenced by the fact that guide’s largest section was reserved for the description of pavilions of big corporate sponsors. The value of this book is $10-$15.

References

1964 New York World's Fair
1965 books